Punalur is a legislative assembly constituency in Kollam district of Kerala, India. It is one among the 11 assembly constituencies in Kollam district. The current MLA is P.S Supal of CPI.

Structure
As per the recent changes on assembly constituency delimitations, the Punalur assembly constituency consists of the municipality of Punalur and 7 neighbouring panchayaths including Anchal, Ariyankavu, Edamulakkal, Eroor, Karavaloor, Kulathupuzha and Thenmala in Punalur Taluk.

Electoral history
Punalur assembly constituency was carved out from Pathanapuram constituency in 1954.

Travancore-Cochin Legislative Assembly Elections

Members of Legislative Assembly 
The following list contains all members of Kerala legislative assembly who have represented the constituency:

Key

* indicates bypolls

Election results 
Percentage change (±%) denotes the change in the number of votes from the immediate previous election.

Niyamasabha Election 2021 
There were 2,05,830 registered voters in the constituency for the 2021 Kerala Niyamasabha Election.

Niyamasabha Election 2016 
There were 2,04,628 registered voters in the constituency for the 2016 Kerala Niyamasabha Election.

Niyamasabha Election 2011 
There were 1,89,994 registered voters in the constituency for the 2011 election.

References

Assembly constituencies of Kerala
Government of Kollam
Politics of Kollam district
Assembly constituencies in Kollam district
1957 establishments in Kerala
Constituencies established in 1957